Thomas Christopher "Chris" Elliott is an American politician currently serving his second term in the Alabama Senate in Senate District 32, having first taken office in November 2018.

Early life and education 
Senator Elliott was born and raised in Mobile and Baldwin Counties. After graduating from St. Paul's Episcopal School in Mobile, Chris received his Bachelor of Arts from the University of Richmond in Virginia, majoring in political science and urban policy.

Active in Republican politics for over two decades, Senator Chris Elliott has worked with numerous statewide and local political campaigns in Alabama. Chris served on the executive committee of the Baldwin County Republican Party, formerly as Vice Chairman for District 2, served on the Steering Committee of the Baldwin County Republican Party, the executive committee of the Alabama Republican Party, is a member and past Chairman of the Baldwin County Young Republicans, and is an associate member of both the Eastern Shore and South Baldwin Republican Women.
 
After completing his undergraduate studies, Chris worked for the Commonwealth of Virginia in the Emergency Management field and for Virginia Power focusing on Nuclear Security and Emergency Preparedness. He returned home to Baldwin County to raise his family where he is a small business owner who has started several successful small businesses.

Chris and his family are members of St. Peter's Episcopal Church of Bon Secour. He is an avid upland bird hunter and blue water sailor who holds a 25 Ton Coast Guard Master’s License.

Political career 
Chris is an active member of the Alabama Senate where he serves as Chairman of the influential County and Municipal Government Committee, Vice-Chairman of the State Governmental Affairs Committee and serves on the Committee on the Judiciary, the Finance & Taxation General Fund Committee, the Tourism Committee, the Banking & Insurance Committee, the Joint Transportation Committee, the Oil and Gas Study Committee, the Committee on Contract Review, the Energy Council, the Space Authority, the Aerospace and Defense Caucus and the National Conference of State Legislatures.

He formerly served as the Chairman of the Baldwin County Commission and the Chairman of the Eastern Shore Metropolitan Planning Organization, as well as on various national, statewide and countywide boards and committees. While Commissioner, Chris also served on the Board of Directors of Baldwin County United Way.

In 2015, he was recognized as one of the Mobile Area's Top 40 Under 40 Young Leaders by Mobile Bay Monthly Magazine and, in 2018, he was recognized in the Yellowhammer Power and Influence 50,Who's Next, an annual list of the 50 most powerful and influential players in Alabama politics. He is a graduate of the Alabama Leadership Initiative and a member of the 30th Class of Leadership Alabama. In 2020, Chris was recognized as an Emerging Legislative Leader by the State Legislative Leaders Foundation and the University of Virginia's Darden School of Business  and was named the Alabama Forestry Association's "Legislator of the Year" in 2021 

Elliott currently serves on the following committees:

•	Chairman  -  County and Municipal Government 
•	Vice Chairman -  State Governmental Affairs
•	Member -  Finance & Taxation General Fund
•	Member - Banking and Insurance 
•	Member – Judiciary 
•	Member - Tourism

Key issues and legislation 
 Infrastructure Funding - Securing transportation funding for Baldwin County is a top priority for Senator Elliott  since his service on the Baldwin County Commission.  Senator Elliott Serves on the Senate Transportation Committee, was appointed by the Lt. Governor to serve on the Joint Transportation Committee (JTC) and serves as the Chairman of the JTC's State Transportation Improvement Plan (STIP) subcommittee.  The STIP allocates state transportation funding dollars.
 School Funding & Debt Structure - Senator Elliott is committed to providing more funding for schools and has successfully shepherded legislation  that ensures fast growing school districts receive more funding sooner, approximately $12 million annually, from Alabama's education budget  and that those dollars are spent efficiently by passing legislation  that protects those dollars without needing to encumber them with debt, a savings of $162 million over 30 years.
 GOMESA Funding - The Gulf of Mexico Energy Security Act of 2006 provides funding to mitigate the impacts of offshore oil and gas drilling and exploration in the Gulf of Mexico.  Senator Elliott is determined that the state's portion of this funding is reserved only for use in Mobile and Baldwin counties.  
 Water Access - Access to our waterways remains a top funding priority for Senator Elliott. He advocates for and has successfully secured tens of millions of dollars in funding for significant improvements to water access in Coastal Alabama. 
 
 I-10 Toll Bridge - Senator Elliott has long supported the improvement of the I-10 corridor over Mobile Bay and has been a leader in highlighting the need for this project.  However, he has been and remains opposed to the original toll scheme proposed by Governor Kay Ivey to pay for the project.  He was instrumental in the efforts to thwart the Governor's toll plan which drew the Governor's ire. After being declared “dead” by Governor Ivey, Senator Elliott worked to find a reasonable solution that preserves existing free routes, limits tolls and prevents foreign ownership of Alabama’s infrastructure. 
 Police Jurisdictions and Extraterritorial Jurisdictions - Taxation without representation has been a rallying cry for over 250 years, yet in Alabama it persists. Senator Elliott led the way passing legislation  to prevent Alabama municipalities from taxing, policing and regulating individuals and businesses outside of their corporate limits.
 Vaccine Mandates - Senator Elliott believes that the decision to take a COVID-19 vaccination should be between an individual and their doctor  and not mandated by the federal government or employers.  He successfully authored and passed SB 9  which prevents employers from terminating an employee based on their COVID-19 vaccine status and provides for broad exemptions from any mandates under state law.
 
 Opposition to Medicaid expansion - Senator Elliott has consistently and vocally opposed efforts to expand Medicaid in Alabama warning not only of the cost to Alabama’s General Fund budget but also the societal costs that disincentivize work.  
 Economic Development - a tireless supporter of economic development in Alabama, Senator Elliott has advocated on behalf of Alabama’s aerospace industry, shipbuilding industry and aluminum industry supporting tens of thousands high paying jobs for Coastal Alabama 
 Skilled Labor - Advanced manufacturing needs skilled labor. Senator Elliott has prioritized funding for the Baldwin Preparatory Academy, an innovative 75 million dollar carrier tech high school that will ensure students are ready to enter the advanced manufacturing workforce as soon as they graduate.

References

External links 

 Political profile at Bama Politics
 Vote Smart - Chris Elliot profile
 http://electchriselliott.com/

Living people
Year of birth missing (living people)
Republican Party Alabama state senators
21st-century American politicians
University of Richmond alumni